Charles Frederick Hulley (Helmsley, 10 March 1892 - Burwood, 26 October 1962) was an Australian Anglican priest.

Hulley was educated at  St John's College, Armidale; and ordained deacon in 1919 and priest in 1922. After a curacy at Quirindi he held incumbencies at Emmaville, Moree and Haberfield.  He was  Dean of Bendigo from 1952 to 1956; and Incumbent at Strathfield from 1956 to 1962.

His only son, Charles Hulley (1928-2009), was a senior executive with Coca-Cola.

References

20th-century Australian Anglican priests
Deans of Bendigo
People educated at St John's College, Armidale
People from Helmsley
1892 births
1962 deaths